Moses George Hogan (March 13, 1957 – February 11, 2003) was an American composer and arranger of choral music. He was best known for his settings of spirituals. Hogan was a pianist, conductor, and arranger of international renown. His works are celebrated and performed by high school, college, church, community, and professional choirs today.  Over his lifetime, he published 88 arrangements for voice, eight of which were solo pieces.

Biography
Born in New Orleans, Hogan lived with five siblings and his parents, who gave their children a passion for music. He was an accomplished pianist by the age of nine. The family attended the A.L. Davis New Zion Baptist Church. Hogan's father, of the same name, was a bass singer in the church choir while Hogan's uncle, Edwin B. Hogan, was the Minister of Music and organist. His mother, Gloria Hogan, was a nurse.

Hogan was musically educated from a young age, first enrolling in Xavier University Junior School of Music. In his sophomore year of high school, he was accepted to New Orleans Center for Creative Arts High School and was in its first graduating class of 1975.

Hogan was awarded a full scholarship to the Oberlin Conservatory of Music, where he studied piano and graduated in 1979 with a Bachelor of Music degree. Immediately after graduation, he began graduate studies at the Juilliard School of Music, which he did not complete, and later went to study classical music in Vienna. During his piano performance years, Hogan won several competitions including first place at the 28th Annual Kosciuszko Foundation Chopin Competition in New York. He returned to Louisiana State University, where he was offered the opportunity to work for his doctorate but decided not to pursue it.

In 1980, he formed the New World Ensemble and began arranging choral music. In 1993, he founded the Moses Hogan Chorale and the following year published his first arrangement, "Elijah Rock". The choir was invited to sing at the 1996 World Choral Symposium in Sydney, Australia.

In 1997, he founded the Moses Hogan Singers; their first album was released in 2002.

A year later Hogan died at the age of 45 of a brain tumor. His surviving relatives include his mother, brother, and four sisters. He was interred at Mount Olivet Cemetery and Mausoleum, New Orleans, Orleans Parish, Louisiana.

Achievements
Founder and conductor of the Moses Hogan Chorale and the Moses Hogan Singers
1st place in the 28th annual "Kosciuszko Foundation Chopin Competition" in New York
Appointed artist in residence at Loyola University New Orleans in 1993
Arranged and performed several compositions for the 1995 PBS documentary The American Promise
Recorded and conducted several arrangements with the Mormon Tabernacle Choir
Critically acclaimed by The New York Times and Gramophone magazine
Brother of Phi Mu Alpha Sinfonia fraternity
Single-handedly introduced the professional choral spiritual and revitalized the Negro spiritual tradition.

Arrangements

Holiday
Started on November 20, 1999, and is known as Negro Spiritual/Moses Hogan Chorale Day.

Discography
 Voices – soundtrack to the 1995 PBS documentary, An American Promise
 The Moses Hogan Choral Series 2003: This Little Light of Mine
 Give Me Jesus – performed by the Moses Hogan Singers/produced EMI Virgin Records
 An American Heritage of Spirituals – performed by the Mormon Tabernacle Choir/conducted by Albert McNeil and Moses Hogan
 Deep River
 The Moses Hogan Choral Series 2002
 Lift Every Voice for Freedom, a collection of American folk songs, poems, hymns, songs of faith and patriotic songs
 This Little Light of Mine: Moses Hogan Choral Series 2003

Songbooks
Feel the Spirit, author, Vol. 1, Mar 2008
Feel the Spirit, author, Vol. 2,  Jul 2008
Oxford Book of Spirituals, editor, 1914 to 2001
Ain't That Good News, author, Nov 2005
The Deep River Collection, author, August 2000

References

External links
 moseshogan.com
 mosingers.com
 
 Moses Hogan Collection at The Historic New Orleans Collection

1957 births
2003 deaths
20th-century American composers
20th-century American conductors (music)
20th-century American male musicians
African-American composers
African-American male composers
American choral conductors
American male conductors (music)
Deaths from brain cancer in the United States
Deaths from cancer in Louisiana
Neurological disease deaths in Louisiana
Juilliard School alumni
Loyola University New Orleans faculty
Oberlin College alumni
Oberlin Conservatory of Music alumni
20th-century African-American musicians
21st-century African-American people